The Samsung Galaxy Tab 3 10.1 is a 10.1-inch Android-based tablet computer produced and marketed by Samsung Electronics. It belongs to the third generation of the Samsung Galaxy Tab series, which also includes a 7-inch and an 8-inch model, the Galaxy Tab 3 7.0 and Samsung Galaxy Tab 3 8.0. It was announced on 3 June 2013, and launched in the US on 7 July 2013.

History 
The Galaxy Tab 3 10.1 was announced on 24 June 2013. It was shown along with the Galaxy Tab 3 7.0 and Galaxy Tab 3 8.0 at the 2013 Mobile World Conference. Samsung confirmed that the Galaxy Tab 3 10.1 would be released in the US on 7 July, with a price of $399.99 for the 16GB model.

Features
The Galaxy Tab 3 10.1 was released with Android 4.2.2 Jelly Bean. In 2022 it still ran perfectly on LineageOS 14.1 (Android 7.1.2). Samsung has customized the interface with its TouchWiz Nature UX software. As well as apps from Google, including Google Play, Gmail and YouTube, it has access to Samsung apps such as ChatON, S Suggest, S Voice, Smart Remote (Peel) and All Share Play.

The Galaxy Tab 3 10.1 is available in WiFi-only, 3G & Wi-Fi, and 4G/LTE  & WiFi variants. Storage ranges from 16 GB to 32 GB depending on the model, with a microSDXC card slot for expansion. It has a 10.1-inch WXGA TFT screen with a resolution of 1280x800 pixel. It also features a 1.3 MP front camera without flash and 3.15 MP rear-facing camera. It also has the ability to record HD videos.

The Micro USB connector on the Galaxy Tab 3 10.1 supports  MHL 1.

Special Edition
In January 2014, Samsung announced that it would release a special edition called Galaxy Tab for Education, starting in April. This special edition features support and features for the K-12 education sector. Among additional specs, Samsung have given it NFC.

References

External links
 

Samsung Galaxy Tab series
Android (operating system) devices
Tablet computers introduced in 2013
Tablet computers